Silvano is an Italian male given name.

Variants 
 Hypocorism: Sila
 Female: Silvana

Variants in other languages 
 French: Sylvain
 Ancient French: Seleuin
 Biblycal Greek:Σιλουανός (Silouanos), Σιλβανός (Silvanos) 
 Hypocorist: Σίλας (Silas)
 English: Sylvanus
 Latin: Silvanus
 Polish: Sylwan
 Slovachian/German: Silvan
 Hungary: Szilvánusz

Origins 
The name derives from the Latin name Silvanus, based on the adjective of the same name, with the meaning of "silvano", "silvestre", "who lives in the forest", "which comes from the forest" (as it is based on silva, "selva", "wood" ). The names Silvio, Silverio, Selvaggio and Silvestro can also be traced back to the same term, which therefore have a similar meaning to Silvano.

The name is present both in Roman mythology, where Silvano is the god of the forests, and in the New Testament, where it is taken by Silvano, one of Paul's traveling companions: he is also called "Sila". It is an Italianization of the biblical Greek Σίλας (Silas), which is an abbreviation of Σιλουανός (Silouanos).

Name-days 

Numerous saints have borne this name; the name day can be celebrated on any of the following dates:

 February 6, St. Silvanus of Emesa, bishop and martyr
 February 10, San Silvano di Terracina, bishop
 4 May, Saint Sylvan of Gaza, bishop and martyr with thirty-nine other companions in the mines of Mismiyā, in Palestine
 July 10, San Silvano, martyr with San Bianore in Pisidia
 10 July, San Silvano (or Silano), martyr venerated in Romagnano Sesia (perhaps one of the sons of Santa Felicita)
 July 13, St. Silas, a disciple of the Apostles
 August 21, San Silvano, martyr in Friuli
 4 September, Saint Silvanus, a child martyr with Silvano and Vitalico in Ankara
 September 22, Saint Sylvan of Levroux, confessor at Bourges
 September 24, Saint Sylvan of Mount Athos, ascetic and Orthodox monk
 2 December, St. Silvanus, bishop in Phrygia

People with the given name 

Notable people with the given name include:

Sports 
 Silvano Abbà, pentathlete and Italian soldier
 Silvano Barco, former Italian cross-country skier
 Silvano Basagni, Italian skeet shooter
 Silvano Beltrametti, sports manager and former Swiss alpine skier
 Silvano Benedetti, sports manager and former Italian footballer
 Silvano Bertini, former Italian boxer
 Silvano Bresadola, Italian footballer
 Silvano Chesani, Italian high jumper
 Silvano Ciampi, former Italian road cyclist and sports manager
 Silvano Contini, former Italian road cyclist
 Silvano Fontolan, football coach and former Italian footballer
 Silvano Martina, sports attorney and former Italian footballer
 Silvano Meconi, Italian weightlifter
 Silvano Meli, former Swiss alpine skier
 Silvano Moro, Italian footballer and football coach
 Silvano Poropat, Croatian basketball coach
 Silvano Prandi, volleyball coach and former Italian volleyball player
 Silvano Raganini, Olympic sports shooter from San Marino
 Silvano Raggio Garibaldi, Italian footballer
 Silvano Schiavon, Italian road cyclist 
 Silvano Simeon, Italian discus thrower 
 Silvano Vigni, Italian jockey 
 Silvano Villa, former Italian footballer

Actors 
 Silvano Tranquilli, Italian actor and voice actor

Authors and journalists 
 Silvano Ceccherini, Italian anarchist and writer

Painters 
 Silvano Campeggi, Italian painter

Politicians 
 Silvano Moffa, Italian politician and journalist

Music 
 Silvano Albanese, stage name Coez, Italian singer-songwriter and rapper 
 Sylvano Bussotti, Italian composer and artist 
 Silvano Carroli, Italian baritone

Holy men 
 Silvano Montevecchi, Italian Catholic bishop
 Silvano Piovanelli, Italian Catholic cardinal and archbishop

Others 
 Silvano Arieti, Italian psychiatrist 
 Silvano Ippoliti, Italian director of photography 
 Silvano Miniati, Italian trade unionist and politician
 Silvano Rogi, character from the television series

See also 
 Silvano (disambiguation)
 Silvano (surname)
 Silas (name)

References

Further reading 
 
 
 

Italian masculine given names